The Merchants' National Bank (1914) building is a historic commercial building located in Grinnell, Iowa. It is one of a series of small banks designed by Louis Sullivan in the Midwest between 1909 and 1919.  All of the banks are built of brick and for this structure he employed various shades of brick, ranging in color from blue-black to golden brown, giving it an overall reddish brown appearance.  It was declared a National Historic Landmark in 1976 for its architecture.  In 1991 it was listed as a contributing property in the Grinnell Historic Commercial District.

Description and history
Merchants' National Bank was built in 1914 and had its grand opening on January the first, in 1915, along with the Purdue State Bank in Indiana, also designed by Sullivan.

Structurally the building is a rectangular box, with a magnificent main facade and a windowed side facade.

Although this building is smaller than either his Owatonna or Cedar Rapids banks it appears just as monumental.  This is due largely to the oversized cartouche that surrounds a circular window on the Fourth Street facade.  Light is introduced into the interior by a series of stained glass windows that alternate with structural posts down the side of the building and through the colored glass skylight that comprises much of the ceiling.

While the bank housed in the structure and its location, the small town of Grinnell did not warrant national attention.  Yet the unveiling of the Louis Sullivan building was given national coverage in the architectural press of the day.  The Merchants' Bank was thus featured in an eleven-page spread in The Western Architect's February 1916 edition.

As he did in his banks in Cedar Rapids and Sidney, Ohio, Sullivan used lions, or at least a grotesque, winged version of a lion, as figurative decoration.  This creature is one of the very few figurative elements that can be found in the architect's designs.  (The angels in his Transportation Building and the Bayard-Condict Building being other examples.)

Some of the plans and even the designs of the ornament were done by Sullivan's draftsman Parker N. Berry, who was shortly thereafter to fall victim to the 1918 Spanish flu epidemic.

In the 1970s or early 1980s, a city beautification project sponsored the planting of several trees in front of the bank.  Gebhard calls this an "unbelievable decision" for the growing plants would obscure more and more of the amazing facade.  These plantings can be easily seen in the gallery pictures, taken in 1985.  These trees were removed as of 2013.

In 2007, the city remodeled its downtown sidewalks and streets so the intersections of the square had the "Jewelbox" appearance to them.  The city also put Planters at the four corners of the crossings which have the "Jewelbox" engraved in them.

Between 2008 and 2009, one of the lions in front of the building was damaged.  Both lions have now been replaced.

Images

Other Louis Sullivan "jewel boxes"
Farmers and Merchants Bank, Columbus, Wisconsin (1919)
Henry Adams Building, Algona, Iowa (1913)
Home Building Association Company, Newark, Ohio (1914)
National Farmer's Bank, Owatonna, Minnesota (1908)
People's Federal Savings and Loan Association, Sidney, Ohio (1918)
Peoples Savings Bank, Cedar Rapids, Iowa (1912)
Purdue State Bank, West Lafayette, Indiana (1914)

See also
List of National Historic Landmarks in Iowa
National Register of Historic Places listings in Poweshiek County, Iowa

Sources
Brooks, H. Allen, The Prairie School: Frank Lloyd Wright and His Contemporaries, University of Toronto Press, Toronto, Ontario, 1972
Elia, Mario Manieri, Louis Henry Sullivan, Princeton Architectural Press, Princeton NY, 1996
Gebhard, David & Gerald Mansheim, Building of Iowa, Oxford University Press, New York, 1993
Kvaran, Einar Einarsson, The Louis Sullivan Pilgrimage, unpublished manuscript
Morrison, Hugh, "Louis Sullivan: Prophet of Modern Architecture", W.W. Norton and Company, New York,  1963
Twombly, Robert, Louis Sullivan: His Life and Work, Elizabeth Sifton Books - Viking, New York, 1986
Wilson, Richard Guy and Sidney K. Robinson, The Prairie School in Iowa, Iowa State University Press, Ames, Iowa, 1977

References

Commercial buildings completed in 1914
Louis Sullivan buildings
National Historic Landmarks in Iowa
Buildings and structures in Poweshiek County, Iowa
Bank buildings on the National Register of Historic Places in Iowa
Art Nouveau architecture in Iowa
Art Nouveau commercial buildings
National Register of Historic Places in Poweshiek County, Iowa
Grinnell, Iowa
Individually listed contributing properties to historic districts on the National Register in Iowa